Iotape, Iotapa or Jotape ( or Ἰοτάπη) was a small town of ancient Cilicia, in the district called Selenitis, not far from Selinus. It was later assigned to Isauria where it was the seat of a bishop; no longer the seat of a residential bishop, it remains under the name Iotapa in Isauria a titular see of the Roman Catholic Church. It minted coins dating to the emperors Philip and Valerian.

Its site is located near Aydap İskelesi, in Asiatic Turkey.

References

Populated places in ancient Cilicia
Populated places in ancient Isauria
Former populated places in Turkey
Roman towns and cities in Turkey
Populated places of the Byzantine Empire
History of Antalya Province
Catholic titular sees in Asia
Hellenistic colonies in Anatolia
Ancient Greek archaeological sites in Turkey